Omega Aerial Refueling Services Flight 70 was a flight supposed to provide aerial refueling to US Navy F/A 18s. It crashed on take-off following an engine separation.

Aircraft 
The aircraft was a modified Boeing 707-321B. It was constructed in 1969 and at the time of the accident it had accumulated 47,856 flight hours with 15,186 flight cycles. The aircraft was previously involved in an incident (under its previous registration N892PA) on February 20, 1969, where it overran the runway at Sydney Airport after suffering a bird strike to the number 2 engine during its takeoff roll. Omega acquired the aircraft on July 29, 1994, before which it was owned by 5 operators. In 1996 it was converted into a tanker.

Crew 
The captain (aged 41), had 5,117 flight hours (2,730 hours on the 707). He was hired by Omega in September 2008. At the time of the accident, he had type ratings for the Boeing 707 and 720, Beriev Be-200 and Airbus A320. He was a former Navy pilot and flew on the 707 and E6A. He also flew the Beechcraft King Air in Europe, as well as the Airbus A320 for United Airlines (as a first officer). He reportedly flew some flights with Principal Air 707s.

The co-pilot (aged 45), had 4,052 flight hours (2,900 hours on the 707). He was hired by Omega in October 2008. In the Navy he flew the Raytheon T-1 Jayhawk, Boeing E6 Mercury and Beechcraft C-12 Huron. At Omega he flew the DC-10 and the 707. He had type ratings on the Boeing 707 and 720, Beriev Be-200 and DC-10.

The flight engineer (aged 50), had around 9,000 flight hours (6,500 hours on the 707). He was hired by Omega in November 2002. In the US Air Force he flew the Lockheed C-141 Starlifter. He also flew 707s and 747s. He was qualified on the 707 and DC-10.

Accident 
The crew, which consisted of the captain, first officer and flight engineer, performed a pre-flight inspection and found nothing out of the ordinary. At 17:23 PDT the flight was cleared for take-off from runway 21 and the crew were instructed to turn left to 160° after departure. The take-off roll was normal and the plane lifted off the runway.

Even with full right aileron and rudder, the plane started to descend and drift to the left. The captain lowered the nose and leveled the wings after which the plane made multiple contacts with the runway. After touchdown, the plane drifted left and departed the runway, crossing a taxiway before coming to rest in a saltwater marsh. A fire erupted and consumed the top of the cabin and the cockpit. All 3 crew members survived.

Investigation

Cracking issues 
As shown in the diagram on the right, the  midspar fitting is of a right-angle configuration in which the vertical tang attaches to the pylon bulkhead and the horizontal upper and lower tangs sandwich  the midspar of the pylon. The lug at the center of the fitting is attached to the forward drag support fitting on the underside of the wing. Fractures of the midspar fitting were observed at the upper and  lower horizontal tangs at  the  radius,  where  the  tangs  merge with the  lug  at the  fitting’s center. 

According to Boeing, before the accident, there were 45 reported midspar fitting cracks, including 3 engine separations.

Service bulletins and airworthiness directives 
Between 1975 and 1993 a series of Boeing service bulletins and FAA airworthiness directives were published to address the midspar cracks. These included initial inspections on No. 2 and No. 3 engine midspar fittings, followed by repetitive visual inspections. When the fittings were eventually replaced with ones with larger radii in critical areas, the inspections were terminated. Nacelle droop stripes were also to be installed, which were supposed to indicate when a nacelle support structure is broken.

Omega conducted visual inspections from 1996 to 2003, when a records review found that the fittings were replaced by the plane's previous operator in 1983. Because of this they stopped the inspections, however post-crash inspection showed no such replacement took place. Because of this fatigue cracks were allowed to form in the inadequate old fittings.

Probable cause 
The NTSB determines that the probable cause of this accident was:

See also 
 Trans-Air Service Flight 671 - A similar incident involving the Boeing 707 in which the No. 3 engine impacted the No. 4 engine.
 El Al Flight 1862 - A similar accident involving the Boeing 747 in which the No. 3 engine impacted the No. 4 engine.
 China Airlines Flight 358 - A similar accident involving the Boeing 747 in which the No. 3 engine impacted the No. 4 engine.
American Airlines Flight 191

References 

Aviation accidents and incidents in 2011
Aviation accidents and incidents in the United States in 2011
Accidents and incidents involving the Boeing 707
Aviation accidents and incidents in California
Aviation accidents and incidents caused by in-flight structural failure
2011 in California
Aviation accidents and incidents involving in-flight engine separations